Dalliella is an extinct genus of gastropods belonging to the family Litiopidae.

The species of this genus are found in Southern France.

Species:

Dalliella brusinai 
Dalliella elisae 
Dalliella neozelanica 
Dalliella prisca

References

Litiopidae